KPTM (channel 42) is a television station in Omaha, Nebraska, United States, affiliated with Fox and The CW. It is owned by Sinclair Broadcast Group, which provides certain services to TBD outlet KXVO (channel 15) under a local marketing agreement (LMA) with Mitts Telecasting Company. Both stations share studios on Farnam Street in Omaha, while KPTM's transmitter is located on Pflug Road, south of Gretna and I-80.

History
KPTM began broadcasting on April 6, 1986 as the third broadcasting property owned by Pappas Telecasting (after flagship KMPH-TV in Fresno, California and WHNS in Greenville, South Carolina). It was the second independent station in Nebraska, and the first new commercial station to sign on in Omaha in 29 years since KETV (channel 7) signed on in September 1957. At the time, Omaha was one of the few top-100 markets that did not have an independent station of its own.

Shortly after signing on as an independent, it was approached by the founders of the fledgling Fox network to join the new network as a charter affiliate. But doing so meant KPTM would have had to carry Fox's first and initially only offering, The Late Show Starring Joan Rivers opposite The Tonight Show. At the time, The Tonight Show was hosted by Johnny Carson, a native of nearby Corning, Iowa who spent his youth in Norfolk, Nebraska and had begun his career at WOWT (channel 6; then WOW-TV) in the early 1950s. Carson and Rivers had been friends for decades until Rivers gave up her slot as permanent guest host on Carson's show to launch her own. KPTM declined the offer, fearing viewer backlash; as a station staffer put it, "Would you carry Joan Rivers in the market where Johnny Carson got his start in entertainment?" This left Omaha as one of the largest markets without a Fox affiliate.

KPTM eventually joined Fox on August 28, 1988, just in time to carry that year's Emmy Awards telecast. Today, the station is a typical Fox affiliate carrying the network's entire lineup, along with the Xploration Station E/I block.

KPTM has significant viewership in Lincoln and included that city in its station IDs for many years; including for over a year after Lincoln received a full-power Fox affiliate of its own, KFXL-TV. It is the only major Omaha station that includes Council Bluffs, Iowa (the second "major city" in the Omaha metro area) in its IDs on a regular basis. On January 16, 2009, it was announced several Pappas stations (including KPTM and its LMA with KXVO) would be sold to Titan Broadcast Management after the purchased received United States bankruptcy court approval.

Corresponding with the station's 25th anniversary in April 2011, it introduced an updated logo. In August 2012, Time Warner Cable (now Charter Spectrum) stopped carrying KPTM's high definition signal in Lincoln and surrounding markets. It remains available on Charter's systems in the Omaha market. , KPTM is still carried in standard definition on channel 9 on Spectrum's Lincoln-area systems.

Titan TV Broadcast Group announced the sale of most of its stations, including KPTM, to the Sinclair Broadcast Group on June 3, 2013; the purchase includes the local marketing agreement with KXVO, which will remain under Mitts Telecasting LLC ownership after the sale. Sinclair announced the closing of the sale on October 3.

Programming
Syndicated programs currently seen on KPTM include Live with Kelly and Ryan, Sherri, The People's Court, Judge Judy, Seinfeld, and Schitt's Creek among others.

Syndicated programming on KPTM-DT3 includes Jerry Springer, Maury, Family Feud, The King of Queens and Seinfeld, among others.

News operation
KPTM presently broadcasts six hours of locally-targeted newscasts each week (with an hour each on Sunday through Fridays). After Fox requested its affiliates to air local newscasts in the early 1990s, KPTM established a news department and began airing a half-hour prime time broadcast at 9 p.m. on June 14, 1990. Within a year, The Nine O'Clock Nightly News was expanded to one hour. From the start, the station put a greater emphasis on national coverage over local content; it also presented more packaged news reports.

With sister station KXVO's original identity and tagline of "All Entertainment, All the Time" in 1995, local news programming did not seem like a natural fit to its schedule. In the late 1990s and early 2000s, KXVO did air 60-second updates seen during the 6 p.m. hour that promoted stories for the upcoming night's broadcast on KPTM. In 2001, KXVO made plans to air a 5:30 p.m. newscast on weeknights utilizing on-air talent and production assistance from KPTM. After the terrorist attacks of September 11, 2001 and the resulting economic downturn, these plans were put on hold and eventually abandoned. In the immediate aftermath of the terrorist attacks, KXVO provided continuous coverage from CNN Headline News.

On January 28, 2006, KPTM began producing The KXVO 15 10 O'Clock News, a weeknight 10 p.m. newscast for KXVO. In April of the same year, former MTV personality and reality show host Brian McFayden was hired to anchor the program, though he left the show to explore other options in his career amid rumors that he was becoming more and more difficult to work with. In any case, McFayden's hiring was unable to save the newscast's ratings, which had been low from the start. In late-August 2006, comedian and Second City Training Center alumnus Matt Geiler was named the new anchor of the broadcast. By this time, the show had become some sort of sketch comedy program with news content being handled by KPTM staff. Throughout its run, The KXVO 15 10 O'Clock News never registered a single ratings point and was cancelled in 2007.

On September 17, 2007, KPTM launched an hour-long weekday afternoon newscast at 4 p.m., which made the station one of the few Fox affiliates to offer a newscast in that timeslot; with the debut of the newscast came the introduction of a new news set. The program competed with WOWT's own half-hour 4 p.m. newscast; within a year, KPTM's 4 p.m. newscast was scaled back to a half-hour, and was cancelled completely by the spring of 2009.

On July 6, 2010, station management announced it would shut down KPTM's news department and outsource production of the 9 p.m. newscast to the Independent News Network starting September 6. The newscasts' in-studio content (news anchors, sports anchors, meteorologists and related personnel) are provided from INN's centralized facilities in Davenport, Iowa, with KPTM retaining a team of Omaha-based reporters to provide local content. As part of the agreement with INN, KPTM's newscasts would be produced in high-definition (the previous in-house newscasts, except for the "Heartland Proud" segment, were not broadcast in HD). Because INN does not produce newscasts on Saturdays, the 9 p.m. newscast was cut back to six days a week (Sunday through Friday). The INN-produced weeknight newscasts were repeated Tuesday through Saturday mornings at 5 a.m. on KPTM-DT2.

By July 2013, after the announcement that KPTM would be acquired by Sinclair, the station announced it would discontinue its agreement with INN and return production of the 9 p.m. in-house, with station management citing viewers' dislike of the outsourced production model. At the outset, the "On the Street" setup would be retained, but the newscasts would be produced with the assistance of KPTM's Fresno sister station KMPH-TV. Although KPTM's announcement did not make clear if or when its newscasts would be Omaha-based, its emphasis that "the anchors, producers, editors, as well as the newsroom managers [will] have a depth of understanding for the local community" suggests an Omaha-based newscast in the future.

Technical information

Subchannels
The station's digital signal is multiplexed:

On September 5, 2006, KPTM launched a new second digital subchannel carrying MyNetworkTV programming during prime time (currently weeknights 7 to 9) and America One programming for the remainder of the broadcast schedule. In 2009, America One programming on the subchannel was replaced with This TV. KPTM-DT2 primarily identifies as "My 42.2", although it is also branded as "This Omaha" reflecting its secondary affiliation. Its logo is similar to the one the main KPTM channel used for most of its first decade on the air. The channel was rebroadcast on Class A station KKAZ-CA. That aired an analog signal on UHF channel 24 from a transmitter in downtown Omaha until April 2010 when it was shut down due to financial concerns. KKAZ-CA's license was surrendered to the Federal Communications Commission on August 5, 2010, and its call sign was deleted from the FCC's database.

On May 6, 2010, it was announced KPTM that would add a new third digital subchannel carrying Estrella TV. KPTM-DT3 began broadcasting May 11 and relayed programming from that network's owned-and-operated station KETD in Castle Rock, Colorado, aside from local commercials and station identifications.

On October 31, 2015, Comet launched on KPTM-DT3, replacing Estrella.

Analog-to-digital conversion
KPTM shut down its analog signal, over UHF channel 42, on June 12, 2009, as part of the federally mandated transition from analog to digital television. The station's digital signal remained on its pre-transition UHF channel 43, using PSIP to display KPTM's virtual channel as 42 on digital television receivers.

References

External links
FOX42KPTM.com - Official KPTM-TV website
Omaha.ThisTV.com - Official This TV Omaha website

Television channels and stations established in 1986
1986 establishments in Nebraska
Television stations in Omaha, Nebraska
Sinclair Broadcast Group
Fox network affiliates
MyNetworkTV affiliates
Dabl affiliates
The CW affiliates
Comet (TV network) affiliates